The year 2010 is the 5th year in the history of Strikeforce, a mixed martial arts promotion based in the United States. In 2010 Strikeforce held 15 events beginning with, Strikeforce: Miami.

Title fights

Events list

Strikeforce: Miami

Strikeforce: Miami was an event held on January 30, 2010 at the BankAtlantic Center in Sunrise, Florida.

Results

Strikeforce Challengers: Kaufman vs. Hashi

Strikeforce Challengers: Kaufman vs. Hashi was an event held on February 26, 2010 at the San Jose Civic Auditorium in San Jose, California.

Results

Strikeforce Challengers: Johnson vs. Mahe

Strikeforce Challengers: Johnson vs. Mahe was an event held on March 26, 2010 at the Save Mart Center in Fresno, California.

Results

Strikeforce: Nashville

Strikeforce: Nashville was an event held on April 17, 2010 at the Bridgestone Arena in Nashville, Tennessee.

Results

Strikeforce: Heavy Artillery

Strikeforce: Heavy Artillery was an event held on May 15, 2010 at the Scottrade Center in St. Louis, Missouri.

Results

Strikeforce Challengers: Lindland vs. Casey

Strikeforce Challengers: Lindland vs. Casey was an event held on May 21, 2010 at the Rose Garden in Portland, Oregon.

Results

Strikeforce: Los Angeles

Strikeforce: Los Angeles was an event held on June 16, 2010 at the Nokia Theatre in Los Angeles, California.

Results

Strikeforce: Fedor vs. Werdum

Strikeforce: Fedor vs. Werdum was an event held on June 26, 2010 at the HP Pavilion at San Jose in San Jose, California.

Results

Strikeforce Challengers: del Rosario vs. Mahe

Strikeforce Challengers: del Rosario vs. Mahe was an event held on July 23, 2010 at the Comcast Arena at Everett in Everett, Washington.

Results

Strikeforce Challengers: Riggs vs. Taylor

Strikeforce Challengers: Riggs vs. Taylor was an event held on August 13, 2010 at the Dodge Theatre in Phoenix, Arizona.

Results

Bracket

Strikeforce: Houston

Strikeforce: Houston was an event held on August 21, 2010 at the Toyota Center in Houston, Texas.

Results

Strikeforce: Diaz vs. Noons II

Strikeforce: Diaz vs. Noons II was an event held on October 9, 2010 at the HP Pavilion at San Jose in San Jose, California.

Results

Strikeforce Challengers: Bowling vs. Voelker

Strikeforce Challengers: Bowling vs. Voelker was an event held on October 22, 2010 at the Save Mart Center in Fresno, California.

Results

Strikeforce Challengers: Wilcox vs. Ribeiro

Strikeforce Challengers: Wilcox vs. Ribeiro was an event held on November 19, 2010 at the Jackson Convention Complex in Jackson, Mississippi.

Results

Strikeforce: Henderson vs. Babalu II

Strikeforce: Henderson vs. Babalu II was an event held on December 4, 2010 at the Scottrade Center in St. Louis, Missouri.

Results

See also 
 List of Strikeforce champions
 List of Strikeforce events

References

Strikeforce (mixed martial arts) events
2010 in mixed martial arts